Keith Andrews FRSE FSA (Hamburg, 11 October 1920 – 4 April 1989 in Edinburgh, Scotland), born Kurt Aufrichtig, was a British art historian and museum curator of German extraction.

Life
Andrews' father was Breslau born Max Aufrichtig (1879–1950), a banker in Hamburg.  His mother, Sabine Kalter (1889–1957), was a leading mezzo-soprano at the State Opera.

The family fled Nazi Germany in 1934 and settled in London.

Andrews was sent to the International Quaker School at Eerde in the Dutch province of Overijssel. He contracted Poliomyelitis at the age of 17 which, apart from preventing his attendance of a university, left him dependent on walking aids for the rest of his life. He took employment at Messrs. Seligman Brothers, an antiquarian bookseller in Cecil Court, and attended evening lectures at the Courtauld Institute, where he earned a diploma in 1953.

Career
Andrews' began as Art Librarian and Curator of Liverpool City Libraries in 1955, remaining there until 1958, before moving to Edinburgh in 1958 to begin his leadership of the Department of Prints and Drawings at National Gallery of Scotland.

His publications on the German Adam Elsheimer (1578–1610) are of particular importance.

Selected publications
 The Nazarenes. A Brotherhood of German Painters in Rome, London 1964.
 The Elsheimers inventory and other documents, in: The Burlington Magazine 114, 1972, S. 595–600.
 A Pseudo-Elsheimer-group: Adriaen van Stalbemt as figure painter, in: The Burlington Magazine 115, 1973, S. 301–306.
 Elsheimer and Dürer: an attempt towards a clarification of Elsheimer's early work, in: Münchner Jahrbuch der bildenden Kunst, 24, 1973, S. 159–174. 
 Adam Elsheimer. Paintings-Drawings-Prints, Oxford 1977. Revidierte deutsche Ausgabe: Adam Elsheimer. Werkverzeichnis der Gemälde, Zeichnungen und Radierungen, München 1985.

References

External links 
 

German art historians
1920 births
1989 deaths
British art historians